Concrete CMS (formerly concrete5) is an open-source content management system (CMS) for publishing content on the World Wide Web and intranets.

Concrete CMS is designed for ease of use, for users with a minimum of technical skills.  It enables users to edit site content directly from the page.
It provides version management for every page, similar to wiki software, another type of web site development software. Concrete CMS allows users to edit images through an embedded editor on the page. As of 2021, there are over 62,000 live websites that are built with Concrete CMS.

Code
Concrete CMS code is based on model–view–controller architecture and object-oriented programming. Some core features are: integrated server caching, developer API, version tracking system and search engine optimization.

Features

Concrete CMS features in-context editing (the ability to edit website content directly on the page, rather than in an administrative interface or using web editor software). Editable areas are defined in Concrete templates which allow editors to insert blocks of content. These can contain simple content (text and images) or have more complex functionality, for example image slideshows, comments systems, lists of files, and maps. Other addons can be installed from the Concrete Marketplace to extend the range of blocks available for insertion. Websites running Concrete can be connected to the Concrete repository, allowing automatic upgrading of the core software and of any addons downloaded or purchased from the Marketplace.

Licensing

Concrete CMS is free and open-source (FOSS) under the MIT software license.

History
Development of Concrete CMS began in 2003 as a rapid-design approach to building the now-defunct LewisAndClark200.org, the official site for the Ad Council's National Council for the Lewis & Clark Bicentennial. 

The version 7 release of concrete was incompatible with prior versions. All prior versions became known as the legacy branch, with the final version being 5.6.4.0 before reaching end of life status on 24 August 2019. Modern Concrete (version 7 and above) features a new user interface, a user-accessible data model called Express, an extensive permissions model, and in-context WYSIWYG editing.

Version 9 was released in October 2021. This major new release added new features like multisite support, boards, new built-in gallery block and a new UI based on Bootstrap 5.

Regular updates and security patches have been released.

Awards and recognition
SourceForge's "Project of the Month" October 2008.
 In the 2010 Open Source CMS Market Share Report, Concrete had:
Growth of developer share: the largest growth of any system in the Developer Support metric
 Installations: Though Concrete5 was only #12 in weekly downloads, they showed the most year-on-year improvement of any system in the survey - up 517%. The system also came in at #3 in total installations, as per the survey—up from #10 last year. Installation data from the survey was also validated by the BuiltWith data which showed Concrete5 in 7th position
 Third Party Support: Concrete5 showed a second year of strong growth in the Developer Support metric.
 Search Engine Visibility: The project site showed the largest gain of any system in the survey for the second year running.
 Project Site Popularity: Concrete5 showed the second largest increase in Alexa Internet rank.
 Mindshare: Concrete5 placed last in Brand Familiarity in 2009; in 2010, the system came in 6th.
 Reputation: Concrete5 led the group in brand sentiment, abandonment and product preference, and came in second in conversion rate.
 In the 2011 Open Source CMS Market Share Report, though Concrete5 still lagged Drupal, Joomla and WordPress in terms of total market share, it had the highest growth.
 As of 1 Jan 2015, Concrete5 was ranked 33rd overall by W3Techs.com, representing 0.2% of the CMS marketplace including open-source and commercial offerings.
 As of Jan. 21, 2016,  Concrete5 Picked for U.S. Army MWR Unified Web Presence

 As of Nov. 3, 2021, Concrete CMS was listed as the 15th most popular on the Entire Internet in Open Source with 60,236 live websites and 55,855 domains redirecting to those sites.

See also 

List of content management systems

References

External links

Documentation 

Free content management systems
Free software programmed in PHP
Blog software
Software using the MIT license